Galisteo is a municipality located in the province of Cáceres, Extremadura, Spain. According to the 2006 census (INE), the municipality has a population of 2001 inhabitants.

Alagón del Río, a town founded in the 1950s by the Instituto Nacional de Colonización within Galisteo municipal limits, became a separate municipality in 2009.

References

External links 
 Alagón del Río - History

Municipalities in the Province of Cáceres